The Property Ombudsman (TPO) scheme is an ombudsman in the United Kingdom. It has been providing consumers and property agents with an alternative dispute resolution service since 1990.      

The scheme was underpinned by statue in 2007 (estate agents) and 2014 (letting and managing agents) and approved by the UK government to help consumers settle their disputes with property businesses such as estate agents, letting agents and property management agents.

Overview  
 
The Property Ombudsman scheme can look at complaints made by consumers against agents registered with the scheme. This may include complaints about poor or incompetent service, including for example: communication and record keeping, marketing and advertising, complaints handling, instructions, terms of business, commission and termination, fees, referencing and inventories.  

Before the Ombudsman can look at a complaint against a property business, the consumer must first give the business the opportunity to consider the complaint and attempt to resolve matters. If the business completes its complaints procedure or eight weeks have passed since the initial complaint was made to them, the consumer can take their complaint to the Ombudsman.

Processes
The Ombudsman reaches a decision on complaints based on the evidence presented, legal principles, the relevant TPO Code of Practice and what is fair and reasonable in the circumstances.  

Where a property business does not subscribe to a TPO Code of Practice, the Ombudsman will make a decision based on best practice, legal principles and what is fair and reasonable.

Funding 
The Property Ombudsman is a not-for-profit ombudsman scheme, funded through membership and case fees. The income pays for the administration and functioning of the scheme. This model allows TPO to provide a free service to consumers, at no cost to the UK taxpayer.

Impartiality 
The Property Ombudsman publishes an annual report which outlines the proportion of total cases supported. In 2017, 62% of sales cases and 67% of lettings cases were supported in favour of consumers.  

The Ombudsman is approved by Government, Trading Standards, the Chartered Trading Standards Institute and the Ombudsman Association as an impartial, unbiased and independent body, though decisions will inevitably be criticised by those parties who have lost.

Status of Ombudsman decisions 
In 2017, TPO received 23,841 enquiries, with the enquiries team helping 14,671 people with their enquiries. An Ombudsman decision was made on 3,658 complaints and awards being made on 2,408 complaints totaling £1.36m.

85% of all complaints received by TPO resolved at an earlier stage before an Ombudsman decision was required. The Ombudsman’s decision is the final stage of The Property Ombudsman’s process. If the consumer accepts the Ombudsman’s proposed decision then this becomes a final decision and will be in full and final settlement of the dispute. Should the consumer not accept the proposed decision they have the choice to make a representation or choose to reject the decision. If the consumer does not accept the Ombudsman’s decision their legal rights are not affected and are free to pursue the complaint through the courts.

Accountability 

The Property Ombudsman’s Board has four main roles:  

 Appoint the Ombudsman  
 Set the Terms of Reference for the Property Ombudsman Scheme  
 Ensure the Ombudsman’s independence  
 Approve the Ombudsman’s budget   

The Property Ombudsman has an independent reviewer who can consider complaints regarding the service provided by TPO. Claire Evans is the current independent reviewer; the independent reviewer for TPO provides the same role to the Legal Ombudsman.   

Satisfaction surveys are conducted for both consumers and property agents; these are conducted on a regular on-going basis and focus on two main factors: Service and Decision/Resolution Satisfaction.

Ombudsman  

 David Quayle, 1990 – 1999
 Stephen Car-Smith, 1999 - 2006
 Christopher Hamer, 2006 - 2015
 Katrine Sporle, 2015 – 2020 
 Rebecca Marsh, 2020 - Present

Governance structure 
In 2018 TPO changed its governance structure from a separate council and board to a unitary board.  The unitary board is chaired by Baroness Diana Warwick who was previously chair of the TPO council.

Approvals 
The Property Ombudsman has a number of different approvals it needs to report to either annually or bi-annually. These are:

References

Real estate in the United Kingdom
Real estate industry trade groups
Housing in the United Kingdom
1990 establishments in the United Kingdom
Organizations established in 1990
Ombudsmen in the United Kingdom